Saint Matthew and the Angel, a painting from the Italian master Caravaggio
 Saint Matthew and the Angel, oil on canvas painting by Giovanni Gerolamo Savoldo
 St. Matthew and the Angel, painting by Rembrandt
 Saint Matthew and the Angel, oil on canvas painting by Guido Reni